Imus SV Squad, are a professional basketball team in the Maharlika Pilipinas Basketball League. It is owned by the local government of Imus in Cavite.

History

Team roster

Head coaches

All-time roster

 Gerald Anderson (2019–2021)
 Alexander James Asis (2018)
 Elmer Mykiel Cabahug (2018–present)
 Brian Daguplo (2018)
 Orly Daroya (2018–present)
 Daniel Jake Diwa (2018)
 Jerwin Gaco (2018–2019)
 Mark Anthony Guillen (2018–present)
 Arden Guiyab (2018)
 Jayjay Helterbrand (2019–present)
 Chester Ian Melencio (2018–present)
 Norvie Monzon (2018–present)
 Jonald Nartea (2018)
 Jerome Ong (2018)
 John Patrick Rabe (2018)
 Andre Paras (2018–2019)
 Jonathan Rivera (2018–present)
 Jessie Saitanan (2018)
 Alqueen Matos (2018)
 John Paul Sarao (2018)
 Jamil Sheriff (2018)
 Jeffrey Tajonera (2018)
 Chester Tolomia (2018)

Season-by-season records
Records from the 2021 MPBL Invitational:

References

External links
 Imus Khaleb Shawarma Facebook Page

Imus Bandera (MPBL)
 
2018 establishments in the Philippines
Basketball teams established in 2018